Andrew Cunningham Wilson (born August 22, 1964) is an American film actor and director. He is the older brother of actors Owen Wilson and Luke Wilson.

Life 
Wilson was born in Dallas, the eldest of three sons of photographer Laura Cunningham Wilson (born 1939) and Robert Andrew Wilson (1941–2017), an advertising executive and operator of a public television station. His younger brothers Owen and Luke are also actors. Wilson's parents are of Irish descent.

Career
Wilson has worked in the entertainment industry since the early 1990s, appearing in more than two dozen films. He has acted in three Wes Anderson films—with a main role in Bottle Rocket (1996)—and other notable credits include Fever Pitch (2005), Idiocracy (2006), Church Ball (2006), Whip It! (2009), Druid (2014), and Time Trap (2017).

Wilson has often collaborated with his brothers, both as an actor and as a director. In 2005, he and brother Luke directed The Wendell Baker Story, which starred Luke (in the title role) and brother Owen.

Partial filmography

References

External links 

20th-century American male actors
21st-century American male actors
American male film actors
Male actors from Dallas
Living people
St. Mark's School (Texas) alumni
1964 births